Dalem Ketut was a king (Dalem) of Bali who ruled at an uncertain time during the age of the Javanese Majapahit Empire (1293-c. 1527). While first a vassal ruler under the Majapahit kings, he later emerged as the king of a separate island realm. He was also known under the names Sri Smara Kepakisan or Tegal Besung. Dewa Tegal Besung is the earliest deified ruler who is honoured at the Pura Padharman Dalem Gelgel, the most important shrine at the central Balinese temple Pura Besakih.

Shift of royal seat

According to the 18th-century chronicle Babad Dalem, Dalem Ketut was the youngest son of the immigrant Javanese Sri Aji Kresna Kepakisan, who was established as Majapahit vassal after the Javanese conquest of Bali in 1343. When his father died he was succeeded in his palace in Samprangan by his eldest son Dalem Samprangan, while Ketut spent his time as a gambler. Since Dalem Samprangan quickly proved incompetent to rule, Ketut was persuaded to take royal titles and establish a new palace (puri) in Gelgel, close to the south coast. The old Samprangan palace lapsed into obscurity, while the power and prestige of Gelgel rose. The late text Babad Bhumi alleges that he was established in Bali in the Saka year 1378 (AD 1456). However, a charter from Badung mentions another lord, a sang adipati (Majapahit regent) called Sang Arya Gajah Wengker who received tributes from drylands and taxes from the sawah fields in the year 1468.

Reign

The Babad Dalem chronicle relates that Dalem Ketut twice visited Majapahit, at the first occasion meeting the king Hayam Wuruk (1350–1389). The account is anachronistic, since it is also asserted that Dalem Ketut was alive at the time when Majapahit collapsed, an event historically dated in the early 16th century. Through this event, Bali remained as a daughter kingdom of Majapahit, a condition which still has a deep symbolic significance for the self-perception of the Balinese. At the end of his life Dalem Ketut was visited by a Brahmin from Kling (India) who recognized the face of the king as the same as the countenance of Mahadewa, the God of the mountain Gunung Agung. The priest prophesied the death of Dalem Ketut, which occurred in a supernatural way; the king disappeared without leaving a trace.

Family and succession

Dalem Ketut left six sons:
 Dalem Baturenggong
 Dewa Gedong Arta
 Dewa Nusa
 Dewa Anggungan, later banished from his caste
 Dewa Bangli
 Dewa Pagedangan
Of these offspring, the last five are mentioned in the Babad Dalem as being sons of Dewa Tegal Besung, whom the scholar C.C. Berg identified with Dalem Ketut, but who is sometimes held to be the ruler's half-brother. The eldest son Dalem Baturenggong succeeded to the throne and inaugurated a period of major political expansion in this part of Indonesia. The anachronisms in the traditional accounts makes it difficult to establish the historical status of Dalem Ketut, but if he survived the fall of Majapahit he would have flourished in the early 16th century.

See also

 History of Bali
 List of monarchs of Bali
 Gelgel, Indonesia

References 

History of Bali
Balinese people
Monarchs of Bali
Indonesian Hindu monarchs
16th-century Indonesian people